The Mendocino Voice is an independent daily online newspaper based in and covering Mendocino County, in Northern California.

History 
The Mendocino Voice was founded in September 2016 by two former employees of The Willits News, a legacy newspaper based in the town of Willits, California, and a property of Digital First Media (DFM). The founders, Adrian Fernandez Baumann and Kate Maxwell, have cited a lack of local news stemming from the acquisition of small northern California newspapers by DFM and its control by Alden Global Capital, as reasons for starting a new local news service.

In the late 2010s The Mendocino Voice became among the most read in Mendocino County, and was cited by The Sacramento Bee, The New York Times and the Los Angeles Times, and featured on the BBC and KQED. In 2019, The Mendocino Voice was selected, jointly with KZYX, to host a Report for America fellow.

The news service is part of a trend in the 2010s towards small, wholly online news services, that have abandoned print publication. As with many such publications it is a member of the Local Independent Online News Publishers group.

Content 
Also of note was its intensive coverage of the Wine Country Fires, and the Mendocino Complex Fire.

References

External links
 The Mendocino Voice

Daily newspapers published in California
Mendocino County, California
Internet properties established in 2016
American news websites